The 1989 FIVB Men's World Cup was held from 17 to 26 November 1989 in Japan. Eight men's national teams played in three cities in Japan (Tokyo, Osaka, and Hiroshima) for the right to a fast lane ticket into the 1992 Summer Olympics in Barcelona, Spain.

Qualification

Results

|}

All times are Japan Standard Time (UTC+09:00).

Location: Osaka

|}

Location: Hiroshima

|}

Location: Tokyo

|}

Final standing

Awards

 Most Valuable Player
  Karch Kiraly
 Best Spiker
  Andrea Gardini
 Best Blocker
  Giovane Gávio
 Best Setter
  Masayoshi Manabe

 Best Defender
  Robert Ctvrtlik
 Best Receiver
  Troy Tanner
 Best on the pitch
  Luis Beltran

References

1989
W
V
V